"Wherever You Go" is a song co-written and recorded by American country music singer Clint Black.  It was released in January 1995 as the second single from the album One Emotion.  It peaked at number 3 on the U.S. Billboard Hot Country Singles & Tracks chart and reached number 4 on the Canadian RPM Country Tracks chart.  The song was written Black and Hayden Nicholas.

Critical reception
Mike Joyce of The Washington Post gave the song a positive review, saying that Black was "resourceful" for "convert[ing] the existential catch phrase 'wherever you go, you're there' into another fool-on-the-bar-stool blues."

Chart positions
"Wherever You Go" debuted at number 69 on the U.S. Billboard Hot Country Singles & Tracks for the week of December 31, 1994.

Year-end charts

References

1995 singles
Clint Black songs
Songs written by Clint Black
Songs written by Hayden Nicholas
Song recordings produced by Clint Black
Song recordings produced by James Stroud
RCA Records Nashville singles
1994 songs